The 2018–19 Premier League was a professional association football league season in England.

2018–19 Premier League may also refer to:

Association football
 2018–19 Armenian Premier League
 2018–19 Azerbaijan Premier League
 2018–19 Premier League of Belize
 2018–19 Premier League of Bosnia and Herzegovina
 2018–19 Egyptian Premier League
 2018–19 Hong Kong Premier League
 2018–19 Iraqi Premier League
 2018–19 Israeli Premier League
 2018–19 Kuwaiti Premier League
 2018–19 Lebanese Premier League
 2018–19 Maltese Premier League
 2018–19 National Premier League (Jamaica)
 2018–19 Russian Premier League
 2018–19 Syrian Premier League
 2018–19 Tanzanian Premier League
 2018–19 Ukrainian Premier League
 2018–19 Welsh Premier League

Basketball
 2018–19 Belarusian Premier League
 2018–19 Israeli Basketball Premier League

Cricket
2018–19 Bangladesh Premier League
2019 Indian Premier League
2018–19 Premier League Tournament (Sri Lanka)

See also
 2018–19 Premier League International Cup